Patty Costello (May 8, 1947, Washington, D.C. – April 16, 2009, Scranton, Pennsylvania) was an American left-handed professional ten-pin bowler and former member of the Professional Women's Bowling Association (PWBA). She was one of the best female bowlers of the 1970s and 1980s.

Born to William Joseph and Marjorie Moran Costello in Washington, D.C., Costello did not begin bowling until the age of 16, but she quickly made a name for herself in the sport, winning the Columbia 300 Open in 1970. Over her bowling career, she earned 25 professional titles, including seven major championships. Her majors include four titles in the PWBA Players Championship (1971, 1972, 1974, 1976) and one victory at the U.S. Women's Open (1976).

In 1976, she won seven events, setting a record for most titles earned in a year. (The record was tied by Carolyn Dorin-Ballard in 2001, although Dorin-Ballard competed in eight more events.) Costello was named Female Bowler of the Year by the Bowling Writer's Association of America in 1972 and 1976.

Costello's career suffered a setback in 1977, when her father suddenly died of a heart attack while watching her provide commentary for a bowling telecast. Afterwards, she experienced depression and anxiety attacks for several years. She told Bowling Digest in 2002, "I was so ultrasensitive to everything around me that I could feel the hair on my arms standing straight up, and no one could comprehend that. I would go to doctors and tell them my symptoms, and they'd look at me like I was ready for the psych ward. It was an awful, lonely place to be." However, Costello recovered and won three titles between 1979 and 1981, including capturing her third U.S. Women's Open crown in 1980. At the time, she was one of only two bowlers (Marion Ladewig being the other) to win the U.S. Open at least three times.  Kelly Kulick and Liz Johnson have since joined that exclusive group. Patty won three more championships in 1985, and was named Player of the Year by her fellow bowlers.

In 1989, Costello was inducted into the Women's International Bowling Congress (WIBC) Hall of Fame (now known as the USBC Hall of Fame).

Costello retired from bowling and began a career with the Community Medical Center in Scranton, Pennsylvania, where she was a transport driver. "Bowling was my job then; this is my job now. In both cases, I've always been happy to meet people, talk to them, and get them feeling good to be around me", she told Bowling Digest.

Costello died of pancreatic cancer, aged 61, at the VNA Hospice, Scranton, Pennsylvania, on April 16, 2009.

References

1947 births
2009 deaths
Sportspeople from Scranton, Pennsylvania
American ten-pin bowling players
Deaths from pancreatic cancer
Deaths from cancer in Pennsylvania